Gahnia schoenoides is a tussock-forming perennial in the family Cyperaceae, that is native to the Society Islands.

References

schoenoides
Plants described in 1786
Flora of the Society Islands
Taxa named by Georg Forster